Édgar David Chinchilla López (born 8 May 1987 in Guatemala City) is a Guatemalan footballer who plays as a striker.

International
Chinchilla made his debut for the Guatemala national football team on 29 June 2009 against Mexico, coming on as a late substitute. He then made his second appearance for the Guatemala national team on 7 September 2012 against Japan coming on as a half-time substitute for Johnny Alexander Girón Ochoa.

Honours
Jalapa
Liga Nacional de Guatemala: Clausura 2009

Comunicaciones  
Liga Nacional de Guatemala: Apertura 2011 

Xelajú 
Liga Nacional de Guatemala: Clausura 2012

Antigua
Liga Nacional de Guatemala: Apertura 2016

References

External links

Guatemalan footballers
1987 births
Living people
Xelajú MC players
Guatemala international footballers
Sportspeople from Guatemala City
2015 CONCACAF Gold Cup players
Association football forwards